Alandica Shipping Academy (also ASA) offers maritime education in Åland, Finland and began operations in 2020. ASA offers basic courses and refresher courses for seafarers as well as undergraduate education at high school and college level. The education takes place at Ålands yrkesgymnasium, Åland University of Applied Sciences and Alandica Shipping Academy. ASA also includes the school ship M/S Michael Sars. ASA is a member of IASST.

Education

STCW-courses 
Alandica Shipping Academy's courses are certified by both Finnish Traficom and Swedish Transport Agency. The courses also meet the international criteria of the STCW convention. ASA has since 1999 offered STCW courses.

 Survival crafts and rescue boats (basic and advanced) STCW A-VI 2.1
 Basic Safety Training STCW A-VI/1
 Advanced Fire Fighting STCW A-VI/3
 Fast Rescue Boats STCW A-VI/2.2

Vocational education 
Maritime education at Ålands yrkesgymnasium

 Repairman
 Deck officer
 Watchkeeping engineer
 Electro-technical rating

Degree programmes 
Maritime programs at Åland University of Applied Sciences

 Electro-technical Engineering 
 Marine/Mechanical Engineering 
 Marine Technology
 Business Administration (focus on shipping)
 Hospitality Management

Background 
Government of Åland decided in Autumn 2019 to found the Alandica Shipping Academy (ASA) in which the three educational institutes within maritime will work together to achieve effective marketing and more customer orientated education (Åland law 2003:17): Åland University of Applied Sciences, Ålands yrkesgymnasium and Åland Maritime Safety Center.

Milestones in maritime education in the Åland Islands 
1854 Navigation education in the Åland Islands began at Ålands folkhögskola. 

1868 Mariehamn Navigation School (Navigationsskolan i Mariehamn) was founded. The school educated nautical officers for the North Sea and Baltic Sea.

1874 Education of sea captains started.

1935 Mechanical engineering education starts at Högre Navigationsskolan i Mariehamn.

1938 The building Mariehamn Navigation School by Lars Sonck was completed. 

1944 Högre Navigationsskolan became Ålands Sjöfartsläroverk.

1961 Ålands sjömansskola (eng. Åland's Seaman's School, today part of Ålands yrkesgymnasium) was founded.

1997 Åland Maritime Safety Center was founded.

2003 Ålands sjöfartsläroverk became part of Åland University of Applied Sciences.

2005 M/S Michael Sars became a school ship, owned by the Government of Åland and operated by Åland Maritime Safety Center. 

2020 Alandica Shipping Academy was founded. Åland Maritime Safety Center became Alandica Shipping Academy which also includes maritime education at Åland University of Applied Sciences and Ålands yrkesgymnasium.

Pictures

External links 
 Official website asa.ax

References 

Maritime education
Organisations based in Åland
Educational institutions established in 2020
2020 establishments in Finland